Min Yaza of Wun Zin (also known as Po Yaza; 1347/48−1421) was chief minister of Ava from 1379/80 to 1421. He was the main adviser to three successive kings of Ava: Swa Saw Ke, Tarabya and Minkhaung I. Under his guidance, Ava made several attempts to restore the Pagan Empire, and methodically acquired its immediate surrounding Shan states between 1371 and 1406. By his death in 1421, he had advised his kings almost for the entire duration of the Forty Years' War (1385–1424) between Ava and Pegu.

The influential court treatise Zabu Kun-Cha, which includes Machiavellian political principles, and mentions several archaeologically known Pyu settlements unmentioned in other prior Burmese chronicles, is attributed to Min Yaza.

Early life
Yaza was born Nga Nyo to Daw Chon and her herbalist physician husband Saya Ohn (ဆရာ အုန်း) in 1347/48. His parents were athi commoners—those who did not live on royal land and paid substantial taxes but owed no regular military service. His zata or Burmese zodiac name was Maung Okka "Mr. Meteor" because a sizable meteor passed through the night he was born.

He began his primary education at a local monastic school where proved to be a brilliant student, mastering all the subjects in just two years. His father died  1355, and his mother sent the 7-year-old to another monastic school for further education. By his teens, he was already collecting manuscripts, copying stone inscriptions and ink writings at local temples and pagodas, and participating in literary seminars alongside adults. At 14, he began tilling the fields as a farmer but he continued to pursue his hobbies of historical research and book collecting. He became well known in the region as "Sa To Nga Nyo" (Nyo the literary works collector). In his late teens, he married Me Chit, daughter of the village headman, U Moe. According to legend, his father-in-law had a rather low opinion of Nyo whom he deemed a talker and not a hardworking farmer. Nonetheless, Moe gave the couple a pair of cattle and three pes (2.13 hectares) of paddy fields, and allowed them to stay at his farmhouse.

Royal service

Joining the service
Nyo's opportunity to escape the village life came when he was 20. In 1368, King Swa Saw Ke came to the Meiktila region with an army of men to restore the broken levee of the Meiktila Lake. When the king inquired about the small golden statue of a young woman in what appeared to be a nat shrine on the embankment, the locals referred Nyo to the king as someone who might know the answer. Summoned before the king, Nyo explained that based on his research the statue was donated by King Anawrahta (r. 1044–77) of Pagan in memory of his young/junior queen consort, who died at the location, and that Anawrahta had also buried another statue underneath the embankment. A skeptical Swa had his men dig beneath the shrine, and the men found another female statue as Nyo predicted. Impressed by the villager's command of history and knowledge, Swa asked Nyo to enter the royal service. Nyo, his wife and his father-in-law were all brought to the capital Ava (Inwa).

Swa Saw Ke years
At Ava, Nyo quickly made his mark. Though he started out as a low-level clerk at the court, Nyo came to be consulted for advice by the king. About a year later, a junior minister at the court died, and Swa appointed Nyo to the position, which came with the title of Sitapyit (စည်းတပြစ်). Though still only in his early twenties, Nyo quickly rose to be the main adviser to the king on the strength of his early advice proving right. His firstwell-known advice recorded in the Burmese chronicles concerned Ava's northern policy. The king, who wished restore the erstwhile Pagan Empire, eyed the various Shan states that now surrounded his Ava Kingdom from the northwest to the southeast. In 1370/71, two northern Shan states of Kalay and Mohnyin were at war, and Nyo advised the king to march to the two states only after they had fought it out and were left exhausted. The king followed the advice, and was able to take over both states in 1371. When Mohnyin was retaken by the Shan state of Maw soon after the Ava armies left, he advised the king not to overstretch, and redraw Ava's northern border farther south to a more defensible Myedu. In 1372–73, Maw forces attacked Myedu to reclaim Mohnyin's former territory but were decisively defeated by Ava forces. The decisive victory brought Upper Burma a respite from Maw raids for the next 14 years.

The king relied on the minister for advice on all major decisions for the rest of his reign. He promoted Nyo to chief minister in 1379/80 with the title of Min Yaza. To be sure, not all of his advice turned out right. In 1380/81 (or 1383/84), he advised against the king's top four nominees for the western kingdom of Arakan's throne, and agreed to Saw Me as the candidate. Saw Me turned out to be a tyrant, and was driven out of Arakan in 1385/86. Likewise, his advice to the king to accept the offer of Gov. Laukpya of Myaungmya to attack the Hanthawaddy Kingdom resulted in three failed campaigns between 1385 and 1391.

Minkhaung years
After King Swa's death in 1400, Min Yaza continued his role as chief minister under the new king, Tarabya. But Tarabya's reign lasted only seven months; the new king was assassinated in November 1400. The court led by Yaza placed Prince Minkhaung, Swa's son by a concubine, on the throne (although the court's selection was later unsuccessfully challenged by Gov. Maha Pyauk of Yamethin). A grateful Minkhaung kept Yaza as the chief minister, whom he called "grandpa". He also appointed Yaza's son Pauk Hla governor Yamethin, and Yaza's son-in-law Thado Theinkhathu governor of Badon and Tabayin.

Yaza was now fully part of the power structure of the Ava regime. The old minister advised Minkhaung during the difficult early years (1401–02) when the country came under attack by Razadarit. Ava survived the invasion, and Yaza led the Ava delegation that negotiated a truce in early 1403. Though not a military man, Yaza was officially the commander of the army that accompanied the delegation to the Hanthawaddy capital Pegu (Bago). In all, he and his delegation spent five months in Pegu. King Razadarit was impressed by the old minister's intellect, and gave a daughter of a Hanthawaddy minister in marriage. Yaza and the young wife had a child, Saw Yin, later governor of Badon.

Back in Ava, Yaza guided Minkhaung who set out on acquiring the surrounding states in the following years. He personally led the 1404/05 embassy to Onbaung (Hsipaw) that resulted in Onbaung's submission. He got the neighboring Nyaungshwe and Mohnyin to submit in 1405/06 and 1406 respectively. (Ava also acquired Arakan in 1406 but the main chronicles do not explicitly mention Yaza or the court in the invasion decision.) Nonetheless, Yaza apparently was the power behind the throne: the king accepted his chief minister's recommendations for governorships at Kalay and Mohnyin. He advised Minkhaung to appoint Kye Taung Nyo, the eldest son of Minkhaung's predecessor Tarabya to the faraway Shan state of Kalay (by the Manipur border) while advising the appointment of Thado, a proven commander, to the crucial northern Shan state of Mohnyin.

The year 1406 was apparently the pinnacle of Yaza's influence. After Crown Prince Minye Kyawswa's successful 1406 Arakan campaign, Minkhaung increasingly relied on his highly militaristic son for policy. For his part, Yaza carried on. In 1406, at the king's behest, Yaza unsuccessfully tried to mollify Theiddat, who believed he should have been the heir-apparent. The minister persuaded Minkhaung not to execute his younger brother but Theiddat defected to Hanthawaddy soon after. In April 1408, Minkhaung famously ignored Yaza's advice to wait until after the rainy season to invade Hanthawaddy, which had driven out the Ava appointed king from Arakan and taken Minkhaung's daughter captive. Yaza accompanied Minkhaung to the front. After three months, the Ava armies were bogged down in the rainy season weather, and were starving. Minkhaung sent Yaza and Yaza's son Sithu of Yamethin to negotiate a truce but the Ava delegation retreated after suspecting an ambush attempt by Hanthawaddy troops.

According to the chronicles, after the disastrous invasion, Min Yaza had to persuade the king to reappoint the latter's favorite queen Shin Bo-Me, who was temporarily lost during the disastrous retreat, as a senior queen again. Minkhaung had demoted her because he suspected she had become involved with the mahout who found her, and brought back to Ava. Minkhaung accepted Yaza's advice. A restored Bo-Me was grateful; she gave the old minister lavish gifts. It was the last mention of Yaza before his death in the standard chronicles. His last advice to the king recorded in the court treatise Mani Yadanabon came in 1413/14 (775 ME).

Min Yaza died in 1421 at 73, a few months before Minkhaung's own death.

Writer
The influential court treatise Zabu Kun-Cha is attributed to Min Yaza. The treatise is a compilation of the famous advice offered by Yaza to kings from Swa Saw Ke to Minkhaung. The text also includes a section on early history of Myanmar, which mentions several settlements across Myanmar that map to the archaeologically known Pyu settlements. According to Hudson, the author(s) of Zabu (Min Yaza or otherwise) knew that "the sites they listed all had some kind of archaeological evidence of antiquity. Kaungsin, Allagappa and Legaing, not prominent in other chronicles, were known to the author(s) when the Zabu was written."

The Zabu was later included in the 1781 treatise Mani Yadanabon, which also includes advice by later ministers. The Zabu portion represents "somewhat half under the total". The Zabu portion has been described as "a repository of historical examples illustrating pragmatic political principles worthy of Machiavelli."

In popular culture
Min Yaza is best remembered in Burmese history for his encounter with Minister Thihapate of Hanthawaddy during the first truce negotiations between Ava and Pegu in 1403. Yaza recounted in Zabu how his counterpart bested him in an impromptu philosophical debate in which Thihapate argued in support of the concept of carpe diem, and Yaza argued for delayed gratification. After a respectful and polite exchange, Yaza conceded his defeat.

In 1912, a biography of the minister, called Wun Zin Po Yaza Wuthtu was published by Maung Maung, a school headmaster of Prome (Pyay). The Fine and Performing Arts Department produced a traditional Burmese opera titled "Wun Zin Po Yaza", which was performed between 1965 and 1973 in Myanmar as well as abroad.

Commemorations
 Wun Zin Min Yaza Hall, Ministry of Foreign Affairs, Yangon
 Po Yaza Street, Yankin Township and North Dagon Township, Yangon
 Po Yaza Street, Mandalay

Notes

References

Bibliography
 
 
 
 
 
 
 
 
 
 
 
 
 
 

1340s births
1421 deaths
Government ministers of Myanmar
Burmese writers
People from Mandalay Region